South Carolina Highway 30 (SC 30, also known as the James Island Expressway or the James Island Connector) is a  freeway in Charleston, South Carolina. The freeway travels from SC 171 on James Island to U.S. Route 17 (US 17) in downtown Charleston.

Route description
SC 30 begins at SC 171 on James Island at exit 3. The interchange consists of a half-diamond interchange. From there, the highway runs northeast, and has two interchanges south of the Ashley River crossing. Exit 2 has access to Harbor View Road and exit 1 is for the Herbert U. Fielding Connector (SC 61).

The route is an orphaned segment of Interstate 526 (I-526). Approximately  separate the eastern terminus of SC 30 from the eastern terminus of I-526's current extent.  Mileage markers and exit numbers on both SC 30 and I-526 are based on an eventual merging of the routes: with miles 1 to 3 occurring on SC 30 and miles 10 to 30 used on the current I-526 route.

Robert B. Scarborough Bridge

The bridge across the Ashley River is named the Robert B. Scarborough Bridge, named for a former state legislator and highway commissioner. The bridge also crosses Wappoo Creek, which is a part of the Intracoastal Waterway.

History
The original SC 30 traveled from St. George to Beaufort. In 1926, SC 39 was extended north with SC 4 from Santee to Summerton on a new route to Sumter, replaced SC 42 north to Bishopville, east with SC 34 to Lydia, then replaced SC 351 north to Hartsville, then northeast on a new route through Society Hill to Bennettsville, then replaced SC 38 northeast to the North Carolina state line at McColl. In 1927, it was truncated to Walterboro, as parts were transferred to US 17 and SC 28 (this segment is now part of US 21). The remainder became part of US 401 in 1933.

SC 30 was reused in 1935 as a renumbering of SC 15 from US 221 in Watts Mills to SC 92 near Cross Anchor. In 1956, this became part of an extended SC 49.

The current route was proposed as early as the 1960s to provide a second and more direct connection between James Island and downtown Charleston. It opened on September 4, 1993 and provided a route off the island that did not require crossing a drawbridge. The route was studied as a toll road in the 1960s, but it was determined that there was not sufficient traffic demand to fund the route and the bridge entirely by tolls.

Exit list

See also

References

External links

SC 30 at Virginia Highways' South Carolina Highways Annex

030
Transportation in Charleston, South Carolina